Mewburn Ellis LLP is one of Europe's leading intellectual property firms. It is one of the UK's largest firms of Chartered Patent Attorneys, European Patent Attorneys, European Trade Mark Attorneys and European Design Attorneys, with offices in London (Headquarters), Bristol, Manchester, Cambridge and Munich.

It has around 60 qualified patent and trade mark attorneys, including 40 partners.

The firm's main practice areas include chemistry, electronics, computing, telecommunications, mechanical engineering and trade marks as well as a large biotechnology and pharmaceutical practice. The firm also undertakes work in areas such as nanotechnology, medical technology, agricultural science and transport.

Mewburn Ellis LLP is ranked as first tier in the Legal 500 directory for patent practice  and is featured in the Chambers directory.

History 
The firm of Mewburn Ellis LLP has its roots in the partnership of John Clayton Mewburn and George Beloe Ellis which was formed in the 1860s under the name of Mewburn Ellis & Co. John Mewburn Clayton was a signatory of the royal charter granted to the Chartered Institute of Patent Attorneys in 1891.  Since that time, six members of the Ellis family have been partners in the firm, including George Ellis's daughter, Margaret Dixon, who was the first woman to practise as a UK patent agent. The last of the Ellis family to work in the firm retired in 1988, although the firm still bears the name of the founding partners.

Offices 
London (Headquarters)
Bristol
Manchester
Cambridge
Munich

Publications and articles 
Patent attorneys from Mewburn Ellis have featured in or written various news articles about the patent attorney profession and IP issues, including in national newspapers such as The Independent and The Times as well as in scientific journals.

'MewsNews' is Mewburn Ellis's regular IP newsletter.

References

External links

Companies based in Cambridge
Law firms of the United Kingdom
Patent law firms
Intellectual property law firms